Curran Michael Phillips (born July 8, 2000) is an American artistic gymnast.  He is a member of the United States men's national artistic gymnastics team.  He previously competed in collegiate gymnastics for Stanford.

Personal life 
Phillips was born in Naperville, Illinois on July 8, 2000, to Debbie and Mike Phillips.  He has one sister. Curran credits his friends Ethan Harvey, Chris Cassano and Scott Smith as being his primary support system  In 2018 he graduated from Naperville North High School.

Gymnastics career

2018–21 
In January 2018 Phillips competed at the Elite Team Cup where his team finished seventh.  In August he competed at the U.S. National Championships in the junior 17-18 division.  He placed fifth in the all-around but co-won the title on parallel bars.  He was named as an alternate for the Pan American Championships team.

Phillips began competing for the Stanford Cardinal gymnastics team in 2019.  At the NCAA National Championships he helped Stanford win the team title.

The 2020 NCAA season was cut short due to the ongoing COVID-19 pandemic.

At the 2021 NCAA Championships Phillips helped Stanford defend their team title.  Individually he won bronze on vault.

2022 
At the 2022 Winter Cup Phillips competed on three events.  He finished first on parallel bars, second on horizontal bar behind Jack Freeman, and sixth on vault.  He was named to the senior national team for the first time and was selected to compete at the DTB Pokal Mixed Cup in Stuttgart alongside Colt Walker, Riley Loos, Katelyn Jong, Karis German, and Levi Jung-Ruivivar.  He competed on vault and horizontal bar, helping the USA qualify to the championship round.  In the final round he posted a 15.050 on the parallel bars to help the USA win.  At the NCAA Championship Phillips helped Stanford defend their national title.  Additionally he placed first on parallel bars, winning his first individual national title.  Phillips was named CGA Specialist of the Year.

In August Phillips competed at the U.S. National Championships where he won his first senior elite level national title on the parallel bars.

2023 
Phillips competed at the 2023 Winter Cup where he placed first on both parallel bars and horizontal bar.  In March he competed at the Baku World Cup, qualifying to both the parallel bars and horizontal bar finals in first and second respectively.

Competitive history

References

External links
 
 

2000 births
Living people
Sportspeople from Naperville, Illinois
American male artistic gymnasts
Stanford Cardinal men's gymnasts